Zinc finger containing ubiquitin peptidase 1 is a protein that in humans is encoded by the ZUP1 gene.

References

Further reading